The Chauri Chaura Incident took place on 4 February 1922 at Chauri Chaura in the Gorakhpur district of United Provinces (now Uttar Pradesh) in British India. The police there fired upon a large group of protesters participating in the Non-cooperation movement. In retaliation, the demonstrators attacked and set fire to a police station, which killed all of its occupants. The incident led to the death of three civilians and 22 policemen. Mahatma Gandhi halted the Non-Cooperation Movement on the national level on 12 February 1922 as a direct result of the incident. In spite of Gandhi's decision, 19 arrested demonstrators were sentenced to death and 14 to life imprisonment by the British colonial authorities.

Background
From 1920 onwards, Indians, led by Mahatma Gandhi, were engaged in a nationwide non-cooperation movement. Using non-violent methods of civil disobedience known as Satyagraha, protests were organised by the Indian National Congress to challenge oppressive government regulatory measures such as the Rowlatt Act, with the ultimate goal of attaining Swaraj (home rule).

The incident
Two days before the incident, on 2 February 1922, volunteers participating in the non-cooperation movement led by a retired soldier of the British Indian Army named Bhagwan Ahir, protested against high food prices and liquor sales at Gauri Bazaar. The demonstrators were beaten back by the local Daroga (inspector) Gupteshwar Singh and other police officers. Several of the leaders were arrested and put in the lock-up at the Chauri Chaura police station. In response to this, a protest against the police was called on 4 February, to be held at the Bazaar.

On 4 February, approximately 2,000 to 2,500 protesters assembled and began marching towards the market lane at Chauri Chaura. They had gathered to picket the Gauri Bazaar Liquor Shop. Armed police were dispatched to control the situation while the protesters marched towards the Bazaar, shouting anti-British slogans. In an attempt to frighten and disperse the crowd, Gupteshwar Singh ordered his 15 local police officers to fire warning shots into the air. This only agitated the crowd who began to throw stones at the police.

With the situation getting out of control, the Sub-inspector Prithvi Pal ordered the police to open fire on the advancing crowd, killing three and wounding several others. Reports vary on the reason for the police retreat, with some suggesting that the constables ran out of ammunition while others claimed that the crowd's unexpectedly assertive reaction to the gunfire was the cause. In the ensuing chaos, the heavily outnumbered police fell back to the shelter of the police chowki while the angry mob advanced. Infuriated by the gunfire into their ranks, the crowd set the chowki ablaze, killing all of the policemen trapped inside, including Inspector Gupteshwar Singh.

The following are the names of the senior officers, constables and chaukidars (government watchmen) who were killed in the incident:

Inspector (Daroga) Gupteshwar Singh
Sub-Inspector Prithvi Pal
Constable Bashir Khan
Constable Kapil Dev Singh
Constable Visheshwar Ram Yadav
Constable Mohammad Ali
Constable Hasan Khan
Constable Gadabaksh Khan
Constable Jama Khan
Constable Manglu Chaubey 
Constable Rambali Pandey
Constable Kapil Dev
Constable Indrasan Singh
Constable Ramlakhan Singh
Constable Mardana Khan
Constable Jagdev Singh
Constable Jaigai Singh
Chaukidar Lakhai Singh 
Chaukidar Wazir
Chaukidar Ghisai Ram
Chaukidar Jathai Ram
Chaukidar Katwaru Ram
 
One of the constables, named Raghuvir Singh, was found to be alive, a few months after the incident. He had been declared dead in the report registered thereafter. He was later produced in the court as the sole witness to the incident. 

Most victims were burned to death, although several appear to have been killed by the crowd at the entrance to the chowki and their bodies thrown back into the fire. The death count is reported in the literature as either 22 or 23 policemen by different accounts, possibly because of including or excluding the reported death of Raghuvir Singh.

Aftermath 
In response to the killing of the police, the British colonial authorities declared martial law in and around Chauri Chaura. Several raids were conducted and hundreds of people were arrested.

Appalled at the outrage, Gandhi went on a five-day fast as penance for what he perceived as his culpability in the bloodshed. In reflection, Gandhi felt that he had acted too hastily in encouraging people to revolt against the British colonial government without sufficiently emphasizing the importance of ahimsa (non-violence) and without adequately training the people to exercise restraint in the face of attack. He decided that the Indian people were ill-prepared and not yet ready to do what was needed to achieve independence. Gandhi was also arrested and sentenced to six years of imprisonment but was later released in February 1924, on grounds of his ill health.

On 12 February 1922, the Indian National Congress halted the non-cooperation movement on the national level as a direct result of the Chauri Chaura tragedy. 

Jawaharlal Nehru and most of the workers of the Congress, who were in prison when Gandhi made this decision, felt that this was a hasty and incorrect decision at a time when the nation was reaching the epoch of support for the Indian independence movement. A few months after this withdrawal, the colonial government arrested Gandhi and put him in Jail.

Trial and conviction
A total of 225 people were brought to trial at Gorakhpur Sessions Court of Judge H. E. Holmes, on charges of "rioting and arson" in conjunction with the Chauri Chaura affair. Of these, six died while in police custody, two were sentenced to 2 years' imprisonment, 170 were convicted and sentenced to death by hanging while 47 were acquitted on 9 January 1923, following a trial which lasted eight months.

A storm of protest erupted over the verdicts, which were characterised as "legalised murder" by Indian Communist leader M.N. Roy, who called for a general strike of Indian workers.

On 30 April 1923, The Allahabad High Court pronounced the final judgements in the case, after appeals had been considered regarding the 170 convicted accused, who had been awarded death sentences:

The (19) people who were sentenced to death were — Nazar Ali, Bhagwan Ahir, Lal Mohammad, Shyamsundar, Abdullah, Vikram Ahir, Dudhi Singh, Kali Charan, Lauti Kumar, Mahadev Singh, Meghu Ali, Raghuvir, Ramlakhan, Ramroop, Sahdev, Rudali, Mohan, Sampat and Sitaram.

14 people were sentenced to life imprisonment.

19 people were sentenced to 8 years' imprisonment.

57 people were sentenced to 5 years' imprisonment.

20 people were sentenced to 3 years' imprisonment.

3 people to 2 years' imprisonment.

38 people were acquitted.

The 19 defendants condemned to death were hanged between 2 and 11 July 1923.

Memorial

A memorial to the dead policemen was dedicated by the British colonial authorities in 1923. Following independence, the words Jai Hind were added to it, as well as a verse by poet Jagdamba Prasad Mishra which is made famous by revolutionary poet Ram Prasad Bismil. The verse reads:  ("On the pyres of martyrs, there will be fairs every year").
The people of the district did not forget the 19 persons tried and executed after the Chauri Chaura incident. In 1971, they formed an association named Chauri Chaura Shaheed Smarak Samiti. In 1973, this Samiti constructed near the lake at Chauri Chaura a  triangular minaret on each side of which a figure is depicted hanging with a noose round his neck. The minaret was built at a cost of Rs 13,500 contributed by popular subscription.
Later another Shaheed Smarak (now the main one) was built by the Government of India to honour those hanged after the incident. This tall memorial has names of those executed engraved upon it. A library and museum related to the independence struggle has been set up near the memorial.
Indian Railways have named a train to honour those executed after the Chauri Chaura incident. The train is named Chauri Chaura Express, which runs from Gorakhpur to Kanpur.

References
 14 ^ Narayan, Badri (14 November 2006). Women Heroes and Dalit Assertion in North India: Culture, Identity and Politics

External links

 A Complete Portal of Chauri Chaura describing the history of Chauri Chaura incident

1922 protests
Indian independence movement
Revolutionary movement for Indian independence
1922 in India
Protests in British India
Mass murder in 1922
Massacres in India
Conflicts in 1922
Indian independence movement in Uttar Pradesh
1922 murders in India
February 1922 events
Attacks on police stations
Attacks on buildings and structures in the 1920s